Manuel Gaspar Costa is an Angolan footballer who plays as a midfielder.

External links 
 

1989 births
Living people
Association football midfielders
Angolan footballers
Angola international footballers
2013 Africa Cup of Nations players
Atlético Sport Aviação players
S.L. Benfica (Luanda) players
Kabuscorp S.C.P. players
Girabola players